Allen Church (June 15, 1928 – August 17, 2019) was an American alpine skiing sports official who took the Judge's Oath at the 2002 Winter Olympics in Salt Lake City. During those games, he was the Chief of Timing and Scoring.

In 2003, he received the Bud and Mary Little Award from the US Ski Team for his work with the Winter Olympics and the International Ski Federation. He received U.S. Ski & Snowboard's highest honor, the Julius Blegen Award, in May, 2015. Church resided in Albuquerque, New Mexico until his death on August 17, 2019.

References

External links 
IOC 2002 Winter Olympics
SV Quietly 2005 article featuring church
US Ski Team 2003 article on awards, including Church's.

1928 births
2019 deaths
American male alpine skiers
Sportspeople from Albuquerque, New Mexico
American referees and umpires
Olympic officials
Oath takers at the Olympic Games